Stefano Lonardi is an Italian computer scientist and bioinformatician, currently Professor and Vice Chair of the Department of Computer Science and Engineering at University of California, Riverside. He is also a faculty member of the Graduate Program in Genetics, Genomics and Bioinformatics, the Center for Plant Cell Biology, the Institute for Integrative Genome Biology, and the
Graduate Program in Cell, Molecular and Developmental Biology.

Stefano received his Ph.D. from the Department of Computer Sciences, Purdue University, West Lafayette, IN.  He also holds a doctorate degree in Electrical and Information Engineering from University of Padua, Italy.  During the summer of 1999, he was intern at Celera Genomics.

Stefano's research interests include computational molecular biology, bioinformatics, genetics, epigenetics and genomics, design of algorithms, and data mining. He has published over 130 papers in these disciplines. He received the CAREER award from NSF in 2005, he was elevated Fellow of the Institute of Electrical and Electronics Engineers (IEEE)  for contributions to computational biology and data mining in 2016, he was named Distinguished Scientist of the Association for Computing Machinery (ACM) for contributions to computational biology in 2017, and he was named Fellow of the American Association for the Advancement of Science (AAAS) in 2018.

Stefano has received research funding from National Science Foundation, Department of Energy, National Institutes of Health, Defense Advanced Research Projects Agency, United States Agency for International Development, United States Department of Energy and United States Department of Agriculture.

References 

Living people
1968 births
Italian bioinformaticians
American computer scientists
Fellow Members of the IEEE
Engineers from California
Purdue University alumni
University of California, Riverside faculty
Distinguished Members of the ACM
American electrical engineers